Wolfgang Brandstetter is an independent Austrian politician and legal scholar who served as a member of the Constitutional Court of Austria from 2018 to 2021. He previously served as the Minister of Justice of Austria, as well as the country's Vice Chancellor.

Career 
In 2007 Brandstetter became director of the Institute for Austrian and European Economic Criminal Law at the Vienna University of Economics and Business.

Brandstetter was chosen to be a member of the Werner Faymann cabinet in December 2013, designated to serve as the country's Minister of Justice. He later succeeded Reinhold Mitterlehner in becoming the Vice-Chancellor of Austria in May 2017.

Brandtstetter left office upon the swearing-in of Heinz-Christian Strache to his position on 18 December 2017. In 2018, he served as a special adviser to European Commissioner for Justice, Consumers and Gender Equality Věra Jourová on rule-of-law issues.

Member of the Constitutional Court, 2018–2021 
In February 2018 Brandstetter was appointed as a member of the Constitutional Court of Austria.

When prosecutors opened a probe in 2021 into whether Chancellor Sebastian Kurz had lied to a parliamentary committee investigating allegations of corruption by members of his previous government, Brandstetter also became a subject of criminal investigations.

In June 2021, Brandstetter resigned following the publication of a series of private text messages sent to him by former colleague Christian Pilnacek (suspended section head in the Austrian Ministry of Justice) containing sexist and racist language.

Honours 
 Knight Grand Cross of the Order of Merit of the Principality of Liechtenstein (11 February 2019).

References 

|-

1957 births
Vice-Chancellors of Austria
University of Vienna alumni
Living people
Justice ministers of Austria